Aquinnah is a town located on the western end of Martha's Vineyard island, Massachusetts. From 1870 to 1997, the town was incorporated as Gay Head. At the 2020 U.S. census, the population was 439. Aquinnah is known for its beautiful clay cliffs and natural serenity, as well as its historical importance to the native Wampanoag people. In 1965, Gay Head Cliffs were designated as a National Natural Landmark by the National Park Service.

Aquinnah is celebrated as a center of Wampanoag culture and a center of pride and tradition among members of the federally recognized Wampanoag Tribe of Gay Head. They make up about one-third of the town's voters and are one of two federally recognized tribes of Wampanoag people in Massachusetts. This area is one of the earliest sites of whaling, with the Wampanoag harpooning their catch long before commercial whaling became the major maritime industry of Martha's Vineyard, Nantucket, and New Bedford, Massachusetts in the 19th-century.

History 
Before the arrival of English colonists, Martha's Vineyard and Aquinnah were inhabited by the Wampanoag, a Native American people, related to the larger Algonquin Nation of Southern New England. Historically they spoke an Algonquian language, part of a large language family that extended down the Atlantic Coast. Based on archeological testing, scientists estimate the earliest signs of human occupation in what is now Aquinnah date back 10,000 to 7,500 years.

The Wampanoag have a separate history; their creation myth tells that their ancestors reached the island after traveling on an ice floe from the far North. They sided with the English settlers in King Philip's War. They performed whaling from small boats. The character Tashtego in Herman Melville's novel Moby-Dick is a Native American harpooner from Aquinnah.

This area was first settled by English colonists in 1669. Later colonists officially divided the town of Aquinnah from Chilmark and incorporated it in 1870 as Gay Head, Massachusetts. Gay Head was a descriptive name referring to the brilliant colors of the cliffs and was frequently noted on lists of unusual place names.

In 1997, by popular vote of 79 to 21, the town changed its name to Aquinnah, Wampanoag for "land under the hill." Throughout the town's history, a Wampanoag community has been among its residents. The people gained federal recognition as the Wampanoag Tribe of Gay Head in 1987 and controls sovereign tribal lands within the town boundaries.

In 2015, erosion at the town's western end led to a $3.5 million, 129 feet (39 m) move of its prominent, red brick Gay Head Light..

In February 2019, the Wampanoag Tribe of Gay Head announced it will begin construction of the Aquinnah Cliffs Casino in March 2019. The tribe is scheduled to proceed with construction despite opposition from the towns of Aquinnah and Chilmark, and a request from the Martha's Vineyard Commission for the Wampanoag tribe to work with the commission to "preserve the unique values of the Vineyard." The Wampanoag tribe says the commission has no jurisdiction over the project.

During the Island's earliest tourist booms of the late 19th century, ferries brought tourists directly to the Cliff's shores. Today, there is no direct transit between Aquinnah and the mainland. Visitors to the island use commercial planes serving Martha's Vineyard Airport, located in nearby West Tisbury, while others travel by car and ferry.

Moshup's Beach
At the foot of the cliffs is Moshup's Beach, named after a great Aquinnah Wampanoag sachem who is said to have been at least partially responsible for many of the features of the island's physical landscape. The ocean is a rare aqua color here, with wave heights that are above average for the area. The water sometimes takes on a red, white or grayish tinge resulting from clay eroding from the cliffs above.

Protection of the cliffs is aggressively enforced by ATV patrols conducted by police and Wampanoag Conservation Rangers, who explain to visitors about the importance of the cliffs to the tribe. Under Massachusetts General Law Ch 272 Sec 59, a person may be fined or arrested for disturbing the clay.

Though not officially designated a "nude beach," nudity is tolerated on Aquinnah Beach several hundred yards northwest of the footpath. The beach has a long history of attracting nude sunbathers who delighted in "clay baths," the baths of which are now strictly prohibited.

Geography 

Aquinnah ranks 334th in area out of 351 communities in the Commonwealth, and is the smallest town by land area on the Vineyard. To the north and northwest is the Vineyard Sound and Devil's Bridge an underwater rock reef most noted for causing the wreck of the City of Columbus in 1884. To the east is the town of Chilmark, its only land border. To the south and west is the Atlantic Ocean. Within viewing distance to the west is the chain of Elizabeth Islands and Nomans Land.  

Aquinnah is separated from the town of Chilmark by Menemsha Bight, Menemsha Pond, and Squibnocket Pond. The only road into Aquinnah lies between the ponds. (Squibnocket Beach, which lies between the ocean and Squibnocket Pond, also connects to the town, but is often washed out during storms. No road crosses it.) Squibnocket Point, just east of this beach, is the southernmost point on Martha's Vineyard.  Aquinnah has four accessible beaches for residents and the public: Philbin and Moshup (public) Beaches off Moshup Trail; Lobsterville Beach on the northern shore at Dogfish Bar, and Red Beach on Menemsha Pond. Other stretches of beach remain under private ownership.

Aside from Aquinnah's famed clay cliffs, the landscape is noted for its rolling terrain, coastal heathlands, deciduous woods, high sand dunes and beach roses. At the 'head' of the island is the Aquinnah Headlands Preserve which provides sweeping coastal views for walkers.

Aquinnah's geography also lends itself to outdoor activities including surf fishing at Lobsterville Beach and Dog Fish Bar, surfing off the beaches of Moshup Trail, and jogging and cycling the State Road and Moshup Trail loop.

Aquinnah is rare in that it is one of the few western-facing coastlines on the east coast. Even so, it still faces the challenge of coastal erosion like the rest of Martha's Vineyard, Chappaquiddick, and nearby Nantucket. Dunes are fortified with healthy grasses but the southwest shoreline has faced an annual reduction in its beaches for decades. The cliffs have also faced higher and stronger seas, leading to a 129 foot inland move of the Gay Head Lighthouse in 2015.

Demographics

As of the census of 2000, there were 344 people, 141 households, and 88 families residing in the town. The racial makeup of the town was 53.49% White, 0.29% African American, 36.63% Native American, 0.87% from other races, and 8.72% from two or more races. Hispanic or Latino of any race were 1.16% of the population.

There were 141 households, out of which 33.3% had children under the age of 18 living with them, 38.3% were married couples living together, 17.7% had a female householder with no husband present, and 36.9% were non-families. 30.5% of all households were made up of individuals, and 7.8% had someone living alone who was 65 years of age or older.  The average household size was 2.44 and the average family size was 3.04.

In the town, the population was spread out, with 25.3% under the age of 18, 8.7% from 18 to 24, 31.7% from 25 to 44, 24.1% from 45 to 64, and 10.2% who were 65 years of age or older.  The median age was 37 years. For every 100 females, there were 96.6 males.  For every 100 females age 18 and over, there were 84.9 males.

The median income for a household in the town was $45,208, and the median income for a family was $46,458. Males had a median income of $37,917 versus $26,250 for females. The per capita income for the town was $21,420.  About 8.6% of families and 7.1% of the population were below the poverty line, including 4.0% of those under age 18 and 14.3% of those age 65 or over.

Government

On the national level, Aquinnah is a part of Massachusetts's 9th congressional district, and is represented by William Keating.  The state's senior member of the United States Senate is Elizabeth Warren. The junior Senator is Ed Markey.

On the state level, Aquinnah is represented in the Massachusetts House of Representatives as a part of the Barnstable, Dukes and Nantucket district, which includes all of Martha's Vineyard and Nantucket, as well as a portion of Falmouth.  The town is represented in the Massachusetts Senate as a portion of the Cape and Islands district, which includes all of Martha's Vineyard, Nantucket and most of Barnstable County (with the exception of the Towns of Bourne, Sandwich, and Falmouth). All of Dukes County is patrolled by the Fifth (Oak Bluffs) Barracks of Troop D of the Massachusetts State Police.

Aquinnah is governed on the local level by the open town meeting form of government. It is led by an executive secretary and an elected board of selectmen. The town operates its own police and fire departments, near the Town Hall at the town center.

In 2001, Aquinnah passed a bylaw requiring archaeological reviews of proposed building sites due to the 10 millennia of Wampanoag history in the town. This bylaw has unearthed scores of significant discoveries.

Education 
Aquinnah is served by Martha's Vineyard Regional School District.  Chilmark Elementary School and Up-Island School in West Tisbury, serve the town's elementary and middle–school students.  Martha's Vineyard Regional High School, located in Oak Bluffs, serves the entire island's high–school population.  MVRHS's teams are nicknamed the Vineyarders, and their colors are purple and white.  The school has a longstanding rivalry with Nantucket High School, and the annual Island Cup between the football teams attracts a strong following.

See also
Gay Head-Aquinnah Town Center Historic District

References

External links

Official town website
 History and Culture Wampanoag Official Webpage
 Aquinnah Music Festival 
Souvenir of Gay Head (Collection of photographs from the 1880s)

 
1669 establishments in Massachusetts
Geography of Martha's Vineyard
Native American history of Massachusetts
Populated coastal places in Massachusetts
Populated places established in 1669
Towns in Dukes County, Massachusetts
Towns in Massachusetts
Wampanoag Tribe of Gay Head
National Natural Landmarks in Massachusetts